Parinacota Province is one of two provinces of the Chilean region of Arica y Parinacota. Its capital is Putre. It is named after the Parinacota Volcano.

History
Arica y Parinacota Region was created on October 8, 2007 under Law 20.175, promulgated on March 23, 2007 by President Michelle Bachelet in the city of Arica. The law divided the former Tarapacá Region into two: the northern portion became the XV Arica y Parinacota Region, and the southern portion remained the I Tarapacá Region.

Geography and demography
It is the second least populated province in the country after Antártica Chilena and fifth most sparsely populated province. Between the 1992 and 2002 censuses, the population fell by 17.3% (659 persons).

Administration 
As a province, Parinacota is a second-level administrative division of Chile consisting of two communes: General Lagos in the northern portion and Putre in the south. The town of Putre serves as the provincial capital. The provincial government is led by delegate Wagner Sanhueza Guzmán, who was appointed by president Gabriel Boric.

References

Provinces of Arica y Parinacota Region
Provinces of Chile